At Home with Julia is a four-part Australian sitcom television series, created and written by Amanda Bishop, Rick Kalowski and Phil Lloyd, which debuted on 7 September 2011 on ABC1. A re-run of the series aired on ABC2 in April 2012. Currently, the series is in syndication in the United States on Vibrant TV Network.

The series depicts a fictional representation of the relationship between Julia Gillard, the actual Prime Minister of Australia (played by Amanda Bishop), and Gillard's real-life partner, Tim Mathieson (played by Phil Lloyd). Fictionalised versions of actual Australian politicians and media personalities are portrayed throughout the series. Much of the action takes place at The Lodge, the Prime Minister's official residence in the national capital of Canberra.

Although the first episode was received either relatively well or neutrally by the media, many critics responded negatively to the series' end. Some saw At Home with Julia as defying previous boundaries in political satire and political parody, with its emphasis on a female politician's personal life rather than her politics and public life. In particular, the media, viewers, and politicians were scandalised by the notorious "flag scene" from Episode 3 ("The Leaker")—in which the Prime Minister and partner Tim Mathieson were depicted apparently naked and post-coital under the Australian flag.

The series was a 2012 Australian Academy of Cinema and Television Arts Awards nominee for Best Television Comedy Series. Criticised by several social commentators as inappropriately disrespectful to the office of Prime Minister,
the show nevertheless proved very popular both with television audiences – becoming the most watched Australian scripted comedy series of 2011 – and with television critics.
According to media reports, international versions of the series are being developed in the United Kingdom and Europe.
None of these shows however have been commissioned as of September 2013.

The series was sold to the United States for broadcast in 2012 and can there be viewed on Hulu.

In February 2013, the notorious "flag sex-scene" from Episode 3 ("The Leaker") was featured in the ABC1 series Shock Horror Aunty!, a compilation of the Australian Broadcasting Corporation's most controversial broadcast comedy incidents.

No second series was produced due to the uncertainty of how long the real Gillard would remain Prime Minister. Amanda Bishop did reprise the role of Gillard for Wednesday Night Fever, however the real Gillard was ousted as Labor Party leader and thus Prime Minister just prior to the show's debut on ABC1.

In an atmosphere of budgetary cuts to the ABC and severe criticism of the use of political satire on it, no follow-up series has been produced about Tony Abbott, the former Coalition Prime Minister.

Cast
Amanda Bishop as Prime Minister of Australia Julia Gillard
Phil Lloyd as Tim Mathieson
Georgina Naidu as Georgina
Michael Denkha as Jesus the Cleaner
Craig McLachlan as Steve the Gardener
Stephen Leeder as Special Agent 'Mervyn Fairmeadow'
 Martin Thomas as Agent Thompson
David Callan as Agent Smith
Joel Barker as Naughty Kid 1
Jack Dawes as Naughty Kid 2
Jack Versace as Naughty Kid 3
Wildenfox Pavarotti as "Bill Shorten", the dog

Guest stars
Paul McCarthy as Minister for Foreign Affairs and previous (2007–10) Prime Minister, Kevin Rudd
Alan Dukes as Deputy Prime Minister of Australia Wayne Swan
Jonathan Biggins as former (1991–96) Australian Prime Minister Paul Keating
Drew Forsythe as independent Member of Parliament Bob Katter
Jim Russell as independent Member of Parliament Rob Oakeshott
Nicholas Cassim as Leader of the Opposition Tony Abbott
Geoff Moxham as radio journalist Alan Jones
Jonathan Biggins as television journalist Tony Jones
Chris Taylor as Jase the Canberra Local
Amanda Bishop as Deputy Leader of the Opposition Julie Bishop
Meaghan Davies as Brianna, the Canberra local.

Episodes

Viewership

Awards and nominations

References

External links

Political satirical television series
Australian television sitcoms
2011 Australian television series debuts
2011 Australian television series endings
Australian Broadcasting Corporation original programming
English-language television shows
Television shows set in Australian Capital Territory
Cultural depictions of Australian women
Cultural depictions of politicians